Youngsville is a census-designated place  in Rio Arriba County, New Mexico, United States. Its population was 56 as of the 2010 census. Youngsville has a post office with ZIP code 87064. New Mexico State Road 96 passes through the community.

Demographics

References

Census-designated places in New Mexico
Census-designated places in Rio Arriba County, New Mexico